Jeon Jun-hyeok (born July 22, 2003) is a South Korean actor and model.

Filmography

Television series

Film

References

External links 
 Jeon Jun-hyeok Fan Cafe at Daum 
 Jeon Jun-hyeok at Naver 
 

2003 births
Living people
South Korean male models
South Korean male television actors
South Korean male film actors